Happy as Lazzaro is a 2018 Italian drama film written and directed by Alice Rohrwacher. It was selected to compete for the Palme d'Or at the 2018 Cannes Film Festival, where Rohrwacher won the award for Best Screenplay.

Plot
On an estate called Inviolata, isolated since 1977, 54 farmhands work on a tobacco farm in a sharecropping arrangement, where they are constantly in debt and thus unpaid. The farm is run in a feudal  manner by the notorious Marchioness Alfonsina De Luna, "Queen of Cigarettes". Lazzaro is a worker on the farm who dutifully follows every command given to him by the Marchioness, her son, Tancredi, and the estate manager. Tancredi befriends Lazzaro and decides to fake his own kidnapping to aggravate his mother and get some of her money. Tancredi and Lazzaro set out in the wilderness and badlands, where they write a false ransom note and bond with each other. They imitate a wolf's howl to make contact with a lone wolf roaming the countryside; Tancredi also warmly suggests they could be half-brothers, since his father was a womanizer. Lazzaro takes the idea of their brotherhood seriously.

Tancredi's mother sees through the fake kidnapping straight away but the estate manager's daughter takes it seriously enough to call the police on her mobile phone during a rare surge in signal strength.  The police arrive on the isolated estate by helicopter and begin to search for the missing marquis; they are astonished by what they find on the farm, saying sharecropping has long been illegal, the workers should be earning wages, and that the children should have mandatory education. The police evacuate Inviolata, and Alfonsina is arrested in a scandal that becomes known as the "Great Swindle." Lazzaro, distracted  by a police helicopter, falls off a cliff and is left behind unconscious in a ravine; later a wolf (perhaps real, perhaps symbolic) spots him and identifies him by smell as a good man.

When Lazzaro awakes, magically many years later, he has not aged and wanders into Inviolata, which is long abandoned and is being raided by robbers (one of whom lived there as a child). The robbers lie to Lazzaro the estate has moved and they are moving possessions for the De Luna family. They also tell him the city is within walking distance. Lazzaro sets out for the city, which he has never been to. There, a woman, Antonia, recognizes Lazzaro from the farm. She takes him into a circle of impoverished survivors of Inviolata who now live in poverty through crime. They express disbelief as to his lack of aging and tell him of the Great Swindle, but Lazzaro is more concerned with finding Tancredi. Recognizing Tancredi's voice when he is calling for his dog, Lazzaro is reunited with his "half-brother." Tancredi recognizes Lazzaro and is overjoyed.

Tancredi, who runs a nightclub, invites the former estate workers for lunch to display his wealth. They arrive with expensive pastries they could ill-afford as gifts, but Tancredi has forgotten about the appointment and they are sent away. Lazzaro and the group overhear organ music from  a church. They enter but are barred from staying by a nun. Somehow, the music leaves with them and fills the air around them. They decide then to return to Inviolata and squat there.

Lazzaro learns Tancredi has lost the De Luna fortune to the bank. He wants to help his half brother and visits a bank, where he accidentally sets off an alarm. The staff and clients are terrified as they think he has a firearm, and when asked his demands, Lazzaro simplemindedly asks for the De Luna fortune to be returned. When the terrified bank clients realize Lazzaro has only a slingshot, they beat him to death. The film ends with  another vision of the wolf, which takes off from the bank and runs free through the city streets, back to the countryside.

Cast
 Nicoletta Braschi  as  Marchesa Alfonsina De Luna
 Adriano Tardiolo as Lazzaro
 Sergi López as Ultimo
 Alba Rohrwacher as adult Antonia
 Luca Chikovani as young Tancredi
 Agnes Graziani as young Antonia
 Tommaso Ragno as adult Tancredi

Reception
The site's critics consensus reads, "Happy as Lazzaro uses a friendship's ups and downs as a satisfyingly expansive canvas for a picture rich with thematic and cinematic depth." At Metacritic, the film has a weighted average score of 87 out of 100 based on 27 critics, indicating "universal acclaim".

Erika Balsom writing for the British Film Institute, described the film as a "devastating exploration of the false promise of progress and the elusive possibility of collective happiness."

Bong Joon-ho said the film "probes the rift between agrarian and modern life, and contains one of the most dazzling twists – and tracking shots – in recent memory."

Accolades

References

External links
 

2018 films
2018 drama films
2010s Italian-language films
Italian drama films
Films directed by Alice Rohrwacher
Films about poverty
Magic realism films